Lycaena orus, the western sorrel copper, is a butterfly of the family Lycaenidae. It is found only in South Africa (Eastern Cape Province, Western Cape Province). The habitat consists of fynbos at various altitudes, from sea level to montane regions.

The wingspan is 21–27 mm. The butterfly flies year-round, peaking in summer.

Larval food is Polygonum undulatum and Rumex lanceolatus. They feed on the edge of the leaves of their host plant, occupying the portion eaten out, the dorsal line of the larva resembling the actual edge of the leaf. The general colour of the larvae matches the leaf or stalk where it is feeding, some are plain green, while others have a pink or salmon dorsal stripe.

References

orus
Endemic butterflies of South Africa
Butterflies described in 1780
Taxa named by Caspar Stoll